Claudio and Isabella is an 1850  Pre-Raphaelite oil painting by William Holman Hunt. It is based on a scene from William Shakespeare's Measure for Measure. In this scene, Isabella is made to choose between sacrificing her brother's life or sacrificing her virginity to Angelo. Hunt's image attempts to depict the characters' tangible emotions in the moment that this choice must be made. Hunt summarized the moral as: ‘Thou shall not do evil that good may come.’

Isabella's purity is reflected by her upright position, her plain white habit, and the sun shining on her through the window, out of which a church can be seen in the distance. Her brother Claudio, shackled to the wall, clearly uncomfortable in both mind and body. He is turned away from his sister, ashamed of the circumstances that brought them here and confronted with the fear of his own imminent death.

When it was first put on display at the Royal Academy of Dramatic Art in 1853 it was accompanied by a quotation from the play:

References

Paintings by William Holman Hunt
1850 paintings
Collection of the Tate galleries
Paintings based on works by William Shakespeare
Works based on Measure for Measure